ι Sculptoris, Latinized as Iota Sculptoris and abbreviated iot Scl, is a solitary star in the southern constellation of Sculptor. It is visible to the naked eye as a dim, orange-hued point of light with an apparent visual magnitude of 5.18. The star is located approximately 336 light years from the Sun based on parallax, and is drifting further away with a radial velocity of +21 km/s.

This is an aging giant star with a stellar classification of K0III, currently on the red giant branch. It has 2.9 times the mass of the Sun and has expanded to 12 times the Sun's radius. The star is radiating 97 times the luminosity of the Sun from its enlarged photosphere at an effective temperature of 5,020 K. These coordinates are a source for X-ray emission, which is most likely (99.4% chance) coming from the star.

References

K-type giants
Sculptor (constellation)
Sculptoris, Iota
CD-29 86
001737
001708
0084